Korab ( or Mali i Korabit) is the highest peak of the eponymous mountain range and the fourth-highest mountain located entirely in the Balkan Peninsula, standing at .

Situated on the border between the two countries, Korab is the highest peak of both Albania and North Macedonia and is also one of only two summits in Europe that are the highest point for more than one country. It is also the 18th most prominent mountain peak in Europe and the third on the Balkan Peninsula.

Korab is situated within the Korab-Koritnik Nature Park. It is noted for its rich flora, including species such as Bosnian pine, European beech and alder.

The peak lies next to the Šar Mountains and is part of the national emblem of North Macedonia.

Geography 
It is around the border triangle of Albania, North Macedonia and Kosovo, southwest of the Šar Mountains.

The peak is a very rugged mountain massif consisting mainly of shale and limestone of the Paleozoic period with block structures, as well as severely damaged gypsum rocks of Permo Triassic. On the west side, the mountain falls steeply over rock walls. The north side consists of craggy rocks. On the same ridge are two other peaks rising over : Shulani i Radomires and Korab III. The southeast, stretching from a few rock bands broken by meadows to the summit is easily accessed, and occasionally by shepherds with their flocks of sheep.

In addition to the Korab peak, there are several other, almost equally high elevations. North of the twin peaks are numerous other nameless, almost equally high rock towers.

The peaks are occasionally interrupted by radial tectonics in the shape of blocks that end in the Radika valley on North Macedonia's side. In its highest part, above , the climate is alpine and includes some alpine flora elements.

The mountain is home to the spectacular Korab Falls in the upper valley of the Dlaboka River. In springtime, the waterfall reaches a height of over 130 meters, making it the highest in North Macedonia. The state border intersects the higher peak, Great Korab.

Ascent from the Macedonian side involves entering the Macedonian–Albanian boundary area, for which a special permit is required from the Ministry of Internal Affairs of North Macedonia, although people regularly trek on Korab without it.

The two main passes in the Korab ridge are the Little Korab Gate and Big Korab Gate.

The mountain has a number of sub-peaks that are higher than 2000 metres. These include Korab II (unnamed peak) , Korab III (unnamed peak) , Korab Gates (peak) , Maja e Moravës , Shulani i Radomirës  and Small Korab .

Climbing 
There are no formal restrictions on climbing the mountain from the Albanian side. The area is now safer and more stable than it has been in recent times. It is possible to drive as far as the local village of Radomira, but the local infrastructure is generally not good. A four-wheel drive vehicle with high clearance may be required. There are no accurate and up-to-date maps, local signposting is poor, and hikers may have to overcome the additional problem of aggressive dogs. An international expedition to climb Mount Korab is organised each September by the mountain club PSD "Korab" in Skopje.

See also 

 Korab-Koritnik Nature Park
 Geography of Albania
 Protected areas of Albania
 Geography of North Macedonia
 List of non-Alpine European Ultras

References

External links 
 Korab, Albania/North Macedonia
 Mount Korab on SummitPost
 Korab climb on YouTube

Mountains of Albania
Mountains of North Macedonia
Albania–North Macedonia border
International mountains of Europe
Two-thousanders of Albania
Two-thousanders of North Macedonia
Highest points of countries
Geography of Dibër County